Horní Štěpánov is a municipality and village in Prostějov District in the Olomouc Region of the Czech Republic. It has about 900 inhabitants.

Administrative parts
Villages of Nové Sady and Pohora are administrative parts of Horní Štěpánov.

References

Villages in Prostějov District